Robert B. Shapiro (born August 4, 1938 in New York City) is a businessman and attorney who has worked extensively with the biochemical corporations G. D. Searle & Company and Monsanto.  Before working in this sector he was Vice-President and legal counsel at General Instrument from 1972 to 1979.  His father, Moses, was Chairman of this company from 1969 to 1975.

From 1979 he worked as attorney for the Illinois-based G. D. Searle. In 1982 he became CEO and Chairman of the NutraSweet subsidiary.  The FDA approved aspartame's use in soft drinks in November 1983, and Pepsi was among the first brands to deploy the product on a large scale in the United States.

When G. D. Searle was acquired by Monsanto in 1985, Shapiro moved up the management chain in the ladder, becoming Vice President in 1990, President in 1993 and CEO in 1995.  He remained CEO of Monsanto until 2000.  He oversaw a period of industrial expansion, acquisitions, and consumer regulatory approval for the genetically-engineered seed businesses.

In 2000 Monsanto merged with the U.S.-based pharmaceutical company Pharmacia & Upjohn to form Pharmacia Corp.  Shapiro became chair of this entity until he stepped down in February 2001. Fred Hassan became CEO of Pharmacia.  The agricultural business of the merged entity was later spun out of Pharmacia to form Monsanto Company, a business focused on agricultural products.  Pharmacia Corporation was subsequently acquired by Pfizer.

Shapiro was a co-founder of Sandbox Industries, a Chicago-based business incubator and venture fund manager in 2003, and currently serves as one of its managing directors.

He is on the board of Conservis, a Sandbox funded firm.

Shapiro was an early member of the board of directors of Theranos, the company created by Elizabeth Holmes with the goal of disrupting the blood-testing industry. 

He has a BA from Harvard University and a JD from Columbia Law School.

References

Sources
Hutchington Encyclopedia

American manufacturing businesspeople
American chief executives of food industry companies
20th-century American Jews
American lawyers
Harvard University alumni
Columbia Law School alumni
1938 births
Living people
Monsanto employees
21st-century American Jews